Drillia cecchii is a species of sea snail, a marine gastropod mollusk in the family Drilliidae.

Description
The length of the shell attains 20 mm, its diameter 7 mm.

The shell is long, narrow and turreted. Its color is yellowish white or grayish white. The shell is adorned with seven very prominent axial ribs and very fine spiral striae. The spire contains 11 convex whorls; separated by a wide and deep depression with the suture in its bottom. The first two whorls are smooth and shining, forming a blunt apex. The next whorls show revolving striae and 7 - 8 axial ribs, often with small brown spots, terminating in the middle part of the canal. This siphonal canal is short, wide and somewhat notched. The aperture measures about ⅓ of the total length of the shell. The columellar lip is concave backwards, while its front is almost rectinear. The thin outer lip is convex and contains a large varix. The anal sinus is large and deep.

Distribution
This species occurs in the demersal zone of the Western Indian Ocean off Aden and Yemen.

References

 Jousseaume, F., 1891. Diagnoses de mollusques nouveaux. Le Naturaliste ser. 2, 13: 231–232

External links
 Syntype in the MNHN, Paris

cecchii
Gastropods described in 1891